Strategus is a genus of rhinoceros beetles belonging to the family Scarabaeidae. The genus is widespread in America from Kansas to South America.

Description
These large beetles have a more or less cylindrical body. They have a striking sexual dimorphism. Males are generally markedly larger than the females and have a long horn on the head and also two forward-looking horns on pronotum.

Species
Species within this genus include:

 Strategus adolescens
 Strategus aenobarbus
 Strategus ajax
 Strategus aloeus
 Strategus anachoreta
 Strategus antaeus
 Strategus argentinus
 Strategus atlanticus
 Strategus caymani
 Strategus centaurus
 Strategus cessatus
 Strategus cessus
 Strategus craigi
 Strategus fallaciosus
 Strategus fascinus
 Strategus hipposiderus
 Strategus howdeni
 Strategus inermis
 Strategus jugurtha
 Strategus longichomperus
 Strategus mandibularis
 Strategus moralesdelgadorum
 Strategus mormon
 Strategus oblongus
 Strategus sarpedon
 Strategus simson
 Strategus splendens
 Strategus surinamensis
 Strategus symphenax
 Strategus syphax
 Strategus talpa
 Strategus tarquinius
 Strategus temoltzin
 Strategus validus
 Strategus verrilli

References
 

Dynastinae
Taxa named by William Kirby (entomologist)
Scarabaeidae genera